Frederick St John may refer to:

Frederick St John, 2nd Viscount Bolingbroke (1732–1787), British peer and courtier
Frederick Robert St John (1831–1923), British Envoy to Venezuela, Serbia and Switzerland
Frederick St John (British Army officer) (1765–1844), general, MP for Oxford